The 2023 Caribbean Series was the 65th edition of the Caribbean Series, played at La Rinconada Baseball Stadium in Caracas and Jorge Luis García Carneiro Stadium in La Guaira, Venezuela from February 2 to February 10, 2023.

The series brought together the champions of each professional baseball league in the countries that make up the Caribbean Professional Baseball Confederation (Venezuela, the Dominican Republic, Puerto Rico, Mexico, Panama and Colombia), plus the representatives of Curaçao and Cuba as guests.

Stadium 
La Rinconada Baseball Stadium and Jorge Luis García Carneiro Stadium in Caracas were the hosts of the round robin matches and the semi-finals and La Rinconada hosted the finals and third place game. La Rinconada stadium was opened for the first time and it is the largest baseball stadium in South America with a capacity of 40,000.

Tournament format 
A single round-robin format was used; each team faced each other once. The four teams with the best records advanced to the semifinals (1st vs. 4th and 2nd vs. 3rd). The two losers met in the 3rd place match and the two winners met in the final to decide the tournament champion.

Participating teams

Preliminary round 

Time zone: Time in Venezuela (UTC–4)

Knockout stage

Semi-finals

Third place play-off

Final

Awards

References

External links 
 Official website (Spanish)

2023
Caribbean Series
Caribbean Series
International baseball competitions hosted by Venezuela
Caribbean Series
Caribbean Series